Dos Marmelos River is a river of Amazonas state in north-western Brazil.

The headwaters of the river are in the Campos Amazônicos National Park, a  protected area created in 2006 that holds an unusual enclave of cerrado vegetation in the Amazon rainforest.

See also
List of rivers of Amazonas

References

Brazilian Ministry of Transport

Rivers of Amazonas (Brazilian state)